USCGC Mackinaw (WAGB-83) is a  former Coast Guard icebreaker on exhibit as a museum ship at the Icebreaker Mackinaw Maritime Museum in Mackinaw City, Michigan. The vessel has been known as the "Queen of the Great Lakes" and "The Largest Icebreaker on the Great Lakes"; the site states that "she was built ... during World War II to meet the heavy demands of war materials and transportation during the winter months".
 
Mackinaw was both commissioned and homeported during active service in Cheboygan, Michigan. Due to her age and expensive upkeep, she was decommissioned and replaced with a smaller multipurpose vessel, which was commissioned in Cheboygan the same day.

The decommissioned Mackinaw (LR number 6119534) remained in Cheboygan. She moved under her own power on 21 June 2006 to a permanent berth at the  dock on the eastern end of the old railroad dock; entry to the area is just south of the Shepler's Marine Service.

Construction
The Mackinaw (WAGB-83) was laid down on 20 March 1943 at Toledo Shipbuilding Company in Toledo, Ohio. The Toledo Shipbuilding Company was unprepared to undertake a shipbuilding project this large and complex  and when the ship remained incomplete more than two years after the company took on the project, the Toledo Shipbuilding Company went bankrupt due to penalties levied for the delayed construction. The American Ship Building Company took over and Mackinaw was launched (sideways) on 4 March 1944, and commissioned on 20 December 1944  Due to the WWII war efforts Toledo area male workers were at an all-time low.  The shipyard opened their hiring to Toledo area women. They initially hired 12 'helpers' within a short time and eventually hired over 100 women workers.

Because she was built specially for the Great Lakes — she was too wide to fit through the pre-1959 Saint Lawrence Seaway — her hull was built lighter than the Wind-class vessels, but shared many characteristics, such as a relatively short length in proportion to the great power developed, a cut-away forefoot, rounded bottom, and fore, aft and side heeling tanks. Diesel electric machinery was chosen for its controllability and resistance to damage. For ground tackle she shipped two  stockless bower anchors with  links.

As well as her twin  stern propellers, Mackinaw also had a  bow propeller, which pulled water from underneath the ice ahead of the ship; when the Mackinaw rode her bow up onto the ice using her cut-away forefoot, the unsupported ice broke apart under the ship's weight into the hollow space underneath. The turbulent wash from the bow propeller also helped the hull slide through the ice around it. Her hull was armored with  steel plating from her keel up to several feet above her waterline.

Service history

The Mackinaw was constructed during the Second World War to extend the shipping season on the Great Lakes; ice formation on the Lakes was ending the season in late December until the ice cleared in late March or early April. Prior to the war, the light icebreakers USCGC Escanaba and USCGC Tahoma had worked to keep the shipping lanes open in winter, but once the U.S. entered the war these two cutters were reassigned to the north Atlantic.  The Coast Guard calculated that extending the shipping season by ten days in winter would allow the delivery of an additional three and a half million tons of iron ore, coal and limestone to the steel industry, or alternatively of 120 million bushels of grain to food markets. After World War II ended with the surrender of Nazi Germany in May 1945 and the Empire of Japan in September of the same year when their delegates signed the articles of unconditional surrender to the Allies, the Mackinaw was slated to continue its service to the USCG in icebreaking duty in the Great Lakes due to being too large to navigate the channels to reach open ocean from the Great Lakes. Aided by several smaller icebreakers in the USCG icebreaker fleet, such as the USCGC Katmai Bay, the Mackinaw provided safe passage for freighters as they delivered their cargo of taconite, grain, and other resources, around the Great Lakes to ports such as Detroit, Chicago, and Gary. When the Soo Locks closed for winter maintenance each year until reopening in late March, the Mackinaw was kept busy creating channels in the ice for the larger freighters to navigate safely to reach the Locks when they reopened for service, including the SS Arthur M. Anderson, the last ship to have contact with the SS Edmund Fitzgerald before it sank with all hands on Lake Superior on November 10th, 1975. Tragically, the Mackinaw was unavailable to support the freighters on that fateful night escorting them through the storm, and was unable to support in the futile search for survivors over the following days.

As years passed, the Mackinaw began aging, even as it continued its military service with the start of the Global War on Terror after the September 11th attacks on the World Trade Center and The Pentagon. After 62 years, the Mackinaw reached the end of her service as she became too expensive to maintain. In preparation for her decommissioning, the USCG commissioned the construction of a new Mackinaw to replace her, the USCGC Mackinaw (WLBB-30), a combination icebreaker and buoy tender. On June 10th, 2006, the Mackinaw was officially decommissioned and retired from service in a large ceremony at her home base in Cheboygan, Michigan, where her successor was also commissioned into active service. After her decommissioning, the Mackinaw was purchased by a local Mackinaw City businessman and prepared to be turned into a museum ship as testament to her service on the Great Lakes and spare her being taken to the scrapyard. She sailed under her own power for the last time on June 21st, 2006 to Mackinaw City, Michigan, taking up her permanent berth at the former railroad dock for the railroad ferry boat SS Chief Wawatam. She was moored up, her smokestack sealed, and many of her equipment preserved for her new life as a museum ship and major tourist attraction in Mackinaw City alongside other landmarks like Fort Michilimackinac, Historic Mill Creek Discovery Park, Fort Mackinac and the Grand Hotel on Mackinac Island, and more.

As museum ship

The museum provides educational tours and overnight stays on the vessel. Visitors can tour the mess deck, the captain's quarters, bridge, engine room, ward room, sick bay and other areas. A retail store on the vessel sells relevant products.

A fee is charged to visitors but all current and former USCG personnel are admitted free upon presentation of proper identification.

Amateur radio

The Charlevoix, Cheboygan, Emmet Counties Public Service Communications Organization (CCECPSO), has established a full-time amateur radio station on board the Icebreaker Mackinaw Maritime Museum.

The CCECPSCO has two repeaters on Mackinaw to provide communications coverage throughout the Straits of Mackinac. These repeaters, operating under the call-sign W8AGB to match the ship's WAGB-83 designation, are on a radio frequency of 145.110 MHz with 103.5 Hz PL tone and 444.375 MHz with 107.2 Hz PL tone. The organization is also actively assisting the museum with restoration and operation of various communications, navigation, and power systems. Included with the radios on board the ship are two Sunair RT-9000 HF transceivers with matching antenna couplers and vertical antennas. Scheduled for spring 2010 is the installation of a third RT-9000 paired with an LPA-9600 solid-state kilowatt amplifier and CU-9100 kilowatt autotuner along with a Sunair F-9800 automatic pre/post filter for each radio to permit simultaneous operation of all three stations, and Sunair RCU-9310 remote control panels.

The vessel is equipped with a 160-40 Meter Dipole, antenna couplers and vertical antennas linked to the two Sunair RT-9000 transceivers. The CCECPSCO group planned to add extra antennae for VHF and UHF repeater use and a KC8TU customized wire antenna.

Amateur radio operators visiting Mackinaw may operate the W8AGB station whenever a CCECPSCO member is present. The CCECPSCO conducts Amateur Radio Field Day operations from Mackinaw on the fourth full weekend in June.

Awards

 American Campaign Medal - 
 World War II Victory Medal - 
 National Defense Service Medal with three service stars - 
 Global War on Terrorism Service Medal -

References

Bibliography 
 Fan site
 HNSA Ship Page: USCGC Mackinaw

External links
 Icebreaker Mackinaw Maritime Museum official site
 Many photos of the Mackinaw in operation and as a museum ship
 Charlevoix, Cheboygan, Emmet Counties Public Service Communications Organization

Icebreakers of the United States Coast Guard
Museum ships in Michigan
1944 ships
Museums in Cheboygan County, Michigan
Ships built by the Toledo Shipbuilding Company